The Guavio Formation (Kicg) is a geological formation of the Altiplano Cundiboyacense, Eastern Ranges of the Colombian Andes.

Etymology 
The formation was defined and named in 1976 by Rodríguez and Ulloa after the Guavio River, Cundinamarca.

Description

Lithologies 

Stratigraphy and depositional environment 
The Guavio Formation, the lowermost unit of the Cáqueza Group, overlies the Batá Formation and is overlain by the Macanal Formation. The unit is subdivided into five members, from old to younger; Conglomerado de Miralindo, Lutitas de Miralindo, Caliza de Malacara, Lutitas de Las Mercedes and Caliza de Las Mercedes. The age has been estimated to be Tithonian to Berriasian, spanning the Jurassic-Cretaceous boundary. Stratigraphically, the formation is time equivalent with the Arcabuco Formation. The formation has been deposited in a shallow marine environment in an oxygen-poor basin.

Outcrops 

The Guavio Formation is apart from its type locality at the Alto de Miralindo and Cuchilla de Manizales, found near Gachalá and Medina.

Regional correlations

See also 

 Geology of the Eastern Hills
 Geology of the Ocetá Páramo
 Geology of the Altiplano Cundiboyacense

References

Bibliography

Maps

External links 
 

Geologic formations of Colombia
Jurassic Colombia
Cretaceous Colombia
Jurassic System of South America
Lower Cretaceous Series of South America
Tithonian Stage
Berriasian Stage
Conglomerates (geology)
Limestone formations
Shale formations
Shallow marine deposits
Formations
Formations
Geography of Cundinamarca Department
Geography of Boyacá Department
Muysccubun